Fritillaria reuteri is a perennial herbaceous bulbous plant, distributed in Turkey and Iran.
It is a species in the genus Fritillaria, in the family Liliaceae. It is placed in the subgenus Fritillaria.

Description 
Fritillaria reuteri is characterised by purplish-brown flowers, tall stems, and narrow leaves. Each pedicel bears two bracts at the base. It flowers from May to June.

Taxonomy 
It was described by Boissier in 1844, Baker (1874), who divided Fritillaria into subgenera, placed F. reuteri in subgenus Monocodon, a subgenus later subsumed into Fritillaria. Modern classifications, based on molecular phylogenetics, confirm this placement.

Distribution and habitat 
This plant inhabits high mountainous areas west of Esfahan, Iran, in wet soil or running water.

References

Bibliography

Databases 
 
 
 
 
 
  

reuteri
Flora of Iran
Flora of Turkey
Taxa named by Pierre Edmond Boissier